Pathological lying, also known as mythomania and pseudologia fantastica, is a chronic behavior in which the person habitually or compulsively lies. These lies often serve no obvious purpose other than to paint oneself as a hero or victim, depending on the circumstance. Pathological lying has been defined as: "a persistent, pervasive, and often compulsive pattern of excessive lying behavior that leads to clinically significant impairment of functioning in social, occupational, or other areas; causes marked distress; poses a risk to the self or others; and occurs for longer than six months." Others have defined pathological lying as "falsification entirely disproportionate to any discernible end in view, may be extensive and very complicated, and may manifest over a period of years or even a lifetime." 

It was first described in the medical literature in 1890 by G. Stanley Hall and in 1891 by Anton Delbrück. There is still much controversy in the fields of psychology and psychiatry about whether or not pathological lying is a unique disorder or merely a symptom of other disorders. A widely agreed-upon description of or diagnostic criteria for pathological lying behaviour does not exist, resulting in controversy regarding what it truly means to be a pathological liar. Theories to explain the root causes include stress, an attempt to shift a locus of control to an internal one, and issues relating to low self-esteem.

Characteristics
Defining characteristics of pathological lying include: 
 An internal motive for the behavior cannot be readily discerned clinically: e.g., long-lasting extortion or habitual spousal battery might cause a person to lie repeatedly, without the lying being a pathological symptom.
 The stories told tend toward presenting the liar favorably. The liar "decorates their own person" by telling stories that present them as the hero or the victim. For example, the person might be presented as being fantastically brave, as knowing or being related to many famous people, or as having great power, position, or wealth.

Some psychiatrists distinguish compulsive from pathological lying, while others consider them equivalent; yet others deny the existence of compulsive lying altogether; this remains an area of considerable controversy.

Diagnosis
Pathological lying is listed in the Diagnostic and Statistical Manual of Mental Disorders, although only as a symptom of other disorders such as antisocial, narcissistic, and histrionic personality disorders, not as a stand-alone diagnosis. The ICD-10 disorder Haltlose personality disorder is strongly tied to pathological lying.

It has been shown through lie detector tests that PF (pseudologia fantastica) patients exhibit arousal, stress, and guilt from their deception. This is different from psychopaths, who experience none of those reactions. People affected by antisocial disorder lie for external personal profit in the forms of money, sex, and power. PF is strictly internal. The difference between borderline personality disorder (BPD) and PF is that BPD patients desperately try to cope with their feeling of abandonment, mistreatment, or rejection by making empty threats of suicide or false accusations of abandonment. Pathological liars do not feel rejected; they have high levels of self-assurance that help them lie successfully. Unlike those with histrionic personality, pathological liars are more verbally dramatic than sexually flamboyant. Narcissists think they have achieved perfection and are unempathetic to others. PF patients do not show these anti-social behaviors; they often lie because they think their life is not interesting enough.

The only diagnosis in the current system where purposeless, internally motivated deception is listed is factitious disorder. This diagnosis deals with people who lie about having physical or psychological disorders. However, research or testing must be done to confirm the individual does not in fact have a physical or other disorder. This may become troublesome due to the fact that medical records are sealed to the public. People with PF tend to lie about their identities and history. Because the symptoms do not match up, the individual may go undiagnosed. They could well be diagnosed under the catch-all rubric of unspecified personality disorder (UPD) (ICD-10 code F69) or perhaps even under ICD-10 code F68.8 "Other specified disorder of adult personality and behaviour" as this defines itself as "This category should be used for coding any specified disorder of adult personality and behaviour that cannot be classified under any one of the preceding headings".

Psychopathy
Pathological lying is in Factor 1 of the Psychopathy Checklist (PCL).

Pathological liars
Lying is the act of both knowingly and intentionally or willfully making a false statement. Normal lies are defensive and are told to avoid the consequences of truth telling. They are often white lies that spare another's feelings, reflect a pro-social attitude, and make civilized human contact possible. Pathological lying can be described as an habituation of lying. It is when an individual consistently lies for no obvious personal gain.

There are many consequences of being a pathological liar. Due to lack of trust, most pathological liars' relationships and friendships fail. If this continues to progress, lying could become so severe as to cause legal problems, including, but not limited to, fraud.

Epidemiology
The average age of onset is before adulthood. Individuals with the condition tend to have average verbal skills as opposed to performance abilities. Thirty percent of subjects had a chaotic home environment, where a parent or other family member had a mental disturbance. Its occurrence was found by the study to be equal in women and men. Forty percent of cases reported central nervous system abnormality such as epilepsy, abnormal EEG findings, ADHD, head trauma, or CNS infection.

See also

References

Further reading
 Hart CL; Curtis DC (2020). "What Is Pathological Lying?". Psychology Today 
 
 

Communication of falsehoods
Habit and impulse disorders
Lying
Symptoms and signs of mental disorders